Mary-Kathryn "M.K." Kennedy is an American TV producer best known for her work on Spanish-language telenovelas produced by the United States-based television network Telemundo. She has been executive producer of Marina, El Juramento and associate producer of ¡Anita, no te rajes!.

executive producer - Telemundo
1.El Juramento (2008)
2.Sin Senos No Hay Paraíso (2008)
3.Marina (2006/07)
associate producer
4.¡Anita, No Te Rajes! (1998)

External links
 

Living people
American television producers
American women television producers
Year of birth missing (living people)